is a passenger railway station located in the city of  Nagareyama, Chiba Prefecture, Japan operated by the private railway operator Ryūtetsu. It is numbered station RN4.

Lines
Hiregasaki Station is served by the Nagareyama Line, and is located 3.6 km from the official starting point of the line at Mabashi Station.

Station layout
The station consists of one side platform serving a single bi-directional track.
The station in staffed.

History
Hiregasaki Station was opened on March 14, 1916.

Passenger statistics
In fiscal 2018, the station was used by an average of 1150 passengers daily.

Surrounding area
 Minami-Nagareyama Station
 Toyo Gakuen University

See also
 List of railway stations in Japan

References

External links

 official home page  

Railway stations in Japan opened in 1916
Railway stations in Chiba Prefecture
Nagareyama